Skowronki  is a village in the administrative district of Gmina Olecko, within Olecko County, Warmian-Masurian Voivodeship, in northern Poland.

The village has a population of 40.

References

Skowronki